The Round Table Stakes was an American Thoroughbred horse race run on dirt and on turf forty-four times between 1961 and 2007. First run at Washington Park Race Track in Homewood, Illinois as the Round Table Handicap, in 1963 it was moved to Arlington Park racetrack in Arlington Heights. In 1985 a fire destroyed the track's grandstand and clubhouse and its races were hosted that year by Chicago's Hawthorne Race Course. A stakes race open to three-year-old horses, it was last contested on Polytrack synthetic dirt over a distance of one and one-eighth miles. From inception through 1968, it was a handicap race for horses age three and older.

The race was named for Round Table, the 1958 American Horse of the Year and U.S. Racing Hall of Fame inductee. Round Table retired with earnings of $1,749,869, the most for any horse in world Thoroughbred racing history. Kerr Stable's win with Rambler II in the 1964 edition of the Round Table Handicap was particularly special for stable owner Travis Kerr who was the owner of Round Table.

The Round Table was run in two divisions in 1974, 1975 and 1983. It was not run in 1988, 1998 and 1999.

Notable past winners include John Henry who won his first graded stakes in impressive style with a twelve-length margin of victory in the September 16, 1978 Round Table Handicap.

In its last running in 2007, the colt Pavarotti set a track record in winning the 2007 edition of the Round Table Stakes. The race was slated to be run in 2008 but was placed on hiatus and dropped from the 2009 schedule.

Track

Surface
 Turf (31) : 1961–1972, 1974–1987, 1989–1993 (31)
 Dirt (13) : 1973, 1994–1997, 2000–2006 (12)
 Polytrack (1) : 2007 (1)

Distances
 1 mile (2) : 1973, 1974
 1 1/16 miles (14) : 1961–1962, 1964–1966, 1968–1972, 1975–1978
 1 1/8 miles (24) : 1963, 1967, 1979–1984, 1986–1987, 1992–1997, 2000–2007
 1 3/16 miles (4) : 1985, 1989–1991

Records
Speed record:
 1:42 flat @ 1 1/16 miles on turf: Rambler II (1964)
 1:47.40 @ 1 1/8 miles on turf: World Class Splash (1992)
 1:47.73 @1 1/8 miles on dirt: Devilment 1:47.73 (2005)

Most wins by a jockey:
 2 – Herberto Hinojosa (1963, 1964)
 2 – Earlie Fires (1966, 1984)
 2 – Pat Day (1980, 1982)
 2 – Don Brumfield (1983, 1985)
 2 – Don Pettinger (1996, 2004)

Most wins by a trainer:
 2 – Harry Trotsek (1962, 1974)
 2 – MacKenzie Miller (1967, 1969)
 2 – Robin Frank (1981, 1983)
 2 – Steven Penrod (1982, 1990)
 2 – Richard J. Lundy (1989, 1991)
 2 – Donnie K. Von Hemel (1996, 2004)

Most wins by an owner:
 2 – Hasty House Farm (1962, 1974)
 2 – Cragwood Stables (1967, 1969)
 2 – Ogden Phipps (1970, 1976)
 2 – Pin Oak Stable (2004, 2005)

Winners

References

Flat horse races for three-year-olds
Ungraded stakes races in the United States
Discontinued horse races
Arlington Park
Recurring sporting events established in 1961
Recurring sporting events disestablished in 2007